Sun Weimin (born 14 July 1955) is a Chinese actor best known for typecasting Zhou Enlai in film and television. He first garnered recognition for his acting in 2013, when his performance in The Story of Zhou Enlai and earned him a Best Actor nomination at the 29th Golden Rooster Awards. In 2018, he starred in the television series My Uncle Zhou Enlai, which propelled him to become one of the most famous actors in China, and he was nominated for Outstanding Actor Award at the 31st Flying Apsaras Awards.

Early life and education
Sun was born in Pulandian District of Dalian, Liaoning, on July 14, 1955. He graduated from the Central Academy of Drama.

Acting career
Sun's first film role was uncredited appearance in the film Two Fugitive Girls (1992). He than guest starred on The Great Military March Forward film series.

He made his television debut in Seven Battles Seven Victories, playing Zhou Enlai. It is his first time to portray Zhou Enlai.

Sun starred as Lu Xun, reuniting him with co-star Shi Lanya, who played Xu Guangping, in the biographical television series Lu Xun and Xu Guangping (2001).

In 2004, Sun has appeared in supporting roles in two films, The Tide and Soldiers Of Huangpu.

Sun joined the main cast of General Zuo Quan as Zuo Quan, a general in the Red Army during the Chinese revolution and the Second Sino-Japanese War.

In the 2000s, he has had guest-starring roles in many television series, including The Story of Tibet (2010), The Sun Comes Up in the East (2010), New Fourth Army (2003), The Story of Minister of Public Security Luo Ruiqing (2007), Spring Comes Early in Grassland (2007), Zhou Enlai in Chongqing (2008), and The East is Red 1949 (2009).

In 2012, he earned critical acclaim for his performance as Zhou Enlai in Five-star Red Flag Fluttering 2, for which he received an Outstanding Actor Award at the 29th Flying Apsaras Awards.

Sun became widely known to audiences with The Story of Zhou Enlai, a historical drama film which garnered him a Best Actor nomination at the 29th Golden Rooster Awards.

In 2015, Sun played the role of Zhou Enlai in Zhao Junjie and Zhai Xiaoxing's film Who Is Undercover, for which he received his second Best Actor nomination at the 30th Golden Rooster Awards.

For his role as Lin Deshui in Battle of Xiangjiang River (2017), Sun was nominated for the Best Supporting Actor Award at the 31st Golden Rooster Awards.

Sun's big break came when Chen Li cast him in My Uncle Zhou Enlai, in which he played Zhou Enlai, a role which brought him much publicity and was nominated for Outstanding Actor Award at the 31st Flying Apsaras Awards. And he won the Best Actor in Television Award at the 12th Chinese American Film Festival.

Filmography

Film

Television

Film and TV Awards

References

External links
 
 Sun Weimin on Chinesemov.com

1955 births
Living people
Male actors from Dalian
Central Academy of Drama alumni
Chinese male film actors
Chinese male television actors